Clay is a city in northeastern Jefferson County, Alabama, United States. It is part of the Birmingham–Hoover–Cullman Combined Statistical Area in the north-central part of the state. Local government is run by a mayor and city council.

Before incorporation on June 6, 2000, it was a census-designated place (CDP). The population nearly doubled in the next decade, reaching 9,708 at the 2010 census, as it has attracted commuters to jobs in the urban areas.

The oldest church in Jefferson County, Mount Calvary Presbyterian Church, is located in Clay. The congregation has been meeting continually since 1806, when it was established by early Scots-American settlers.

On January 23, 2012, a total of 231 homes and businesses were either damaged or destroyed when an EF3 tornado passed through several subdivisions. Damage was heavy in downtown Center Point. Some of the homes were flattened. Trees were snapped and uprooted along the path and the Center Point Elementary School was damaged. A sixteen-year-old student from Jefferson County International Baccalaureate School died before reaching cover during the tornado.

Geography

Media
The local newspaper is The Trussville Tribune. The Tribune, which covers government, sports, crime, and community events in Trussville, Clay and Pinson, is published each Wednesday. It provides current news online.

Demographics

2000 census
At the 2000 census, there were 4,947 people, 1,636 households, and 1,421 families living in the CDP. The racial makeup of the CDP was 97.96% White, 0.71% Black or African American, 0.30% Native American, 0.40% Asian, 0.12% from other races, and 0.51% from two or more races.  0.40% of the population were Hispanic or Latino of any race.

Of the 1,636 households 49.3% had children under the age of 18 living with them, 76.4% were married couples living together, 8.3% had a female householder with no husband present, and 13.1% were non-families. 11.2% of households were one person and 3.9% were one person aged 65 or older.  The average household size was 3.02 and the average family size was 3.26.

The age distribution was 30.7% under the age of 18, 7.4% from 18 to 24, 33.6% from 25 to 44, 22.4% from 45 to 64, and 5.9% 65 or older.  The median age was 35 years. For every 100 females, there were 98.0 males.  For every 100 females age 18 and over, there were 94.9 males.

The median household income was $61,042 and the median family income  was $64,798. Males had a median income of $40,092 versus $28,787 for females. The per capita income for the CDP was $21,323.  About 3.9% of families and 4.5% of the population were below the poverty line, including 6.3% of those under age 18 and 11.7% of those age 65 or over.

2010 census
At the 2010 census, there were 9,708 people, 3,574 households, and 2,780 families living in the city. The racial makeup of the city was 84.1% White, 13.3% Black or African American, 0.3% Native American, 0.6% Asian, 0.6% from other races, and 1.1% from two or more races. 1.3% of the population were Hispanic or Latino of any race.

Of the 3,574 households 32.4% had children under the age of 18 living with them, 64.3% were married couples living together, 9.7% had a female householder with no husband present, and 22.2% were non-families. 20.0% of households were one person and 9.2% were one person aged 65 or older.  The average household size was 2.72 and the average family size was 3.13.

The age distribution was 23.9% under the age of 18, 8.8% from 18 to 24, 24.2% from 25 to 44, 31.9% from 45 to 64, and 11.1% 65 or older. The median age was 40.1 years. For every 100 females, there were 94.3 males.  For every 100 females age 18 and over, there were 95.5 males.

The median household income was $70,273 and the median family income  was $82,911. Males had a median income of $52,800 versus $42,813 for females. The per capita income for the city was $28,000. About 1.7% of families and 3.6% of the population were below the poverty line, including 4.7% of those under age 18 and 8.7% of those age 65 or over.

2020 census

As of the 2020 United States census, there were 10,291 people, 3,555 households, and 2,674 families residing in the city.

Notable people
 Clayne Crawford, actor
 Courtney Porter, Miss Alabama 2011
 YBN Nahmir, rapper

References

External links
Clay News - Local newspaper
City official site
Clay Chamber of Commerce

Cities in Alabama
Cities in Jefferson County, Alabama
Former census-designated places in Alabama
Birmingham metropolitan area, Alabama